The Central District of Khansar County is a district (bakhsh) in Khansar County, Isfahan Province, Iran. At the 2006 census, its population was 31,542, in 9,394 families.  The District has one city: Khansar. The District has three rural districts (dehestan): Cheshmeh Sar Rural District, Kuhsar Rural District, and Poshtkuh Rural District.

References 

Khansar County
Districts of Isfahan Province